The ITC Stella Maris is a tennis complex in Umag, Croatia. The complex is the host of the annual 250 series stop, the Croatia Open Umag.  The stadium court has a capacity of 3,500 people.

See also
 List of tennis stadiums by capacity

References

Tennis venues in Croatia
Buildings and structures in Istria County